Before I Self Destruct is a 2009 American direct-to-video crime drama film starring Curtis Jackson, who also served as writer, director, producer and executive producer, that is included with his fourth studio album of the same name. It was released on November 23, 2009, two weeks after the release of the album.

Plot
Clarence Jenkins (Curtis "50 Cent" Jackson), who lives with his mother Donna (Kar) and his gifted brother Shocka (Elijah "Strong-E" Williams), works in a supermarket after having his dreams of playing basketball professionally destroyed due to a knee injury. He longs for pretty girls he feels are beyond his reach, including a woman named Princess (Sasha Delvalle).

Afte Donna is accidentally shot and killed by a gunman named Tiny (Shorty Red) in a drive-by shooting, Clarence is unsure how to prevent Shocka, who has already been accepted to all eight Ivy League universities, from going into foster care. After being fired from his job and coming back to find an eviction notice at his door, Clarence finds Tiny and kills him with a revolver that he finds beneath the bed at his hotel room. He then visits Sean (Clifton Powell), who is the local crime boss, to inform him that he killed Tiny who had previously worked for Sean. Sean likes Clarence's style and he hires him to be his new hitman.

After obtaining financial success from his newly found criminal lifestyle and becoming able to provide to his brother, Clarence runs into Princess, the beautiful woman from the supermarket. He begins to develop a close bond with Princess but is unable to realize that she is using him. Clarence bestows gold, diamonds and payback when Princess's ex-boyfriend Rafael (Gabriel Ellis) gets released from prison.

Rafael tracks Princess down by calling her from her mother's phone while she is in bed with Clarence. When Rafael demands the money he gave her for safekeeping, she meets up with him for sex but when he persists in his demands, the only word Princess says is "Clarence", implying that she gave Clarence Rafael's money. In order to take back his money, Rafael has her call Clarence and ask him to come to her mother's house to help move furniture. Princess and Rafael wait in his car across the street from her mother's house. As soon as Clarence steps out of the car, Rafael fatally shoots Clarence.

When Princess arrives and steals all of Clarence's money from the drawer, Shocka realizes what is going on and vows revenge on her for getting his brother killed.

Cast

Music 
The music for the film is composed by G-Unit frontman 50 Cent and Ky Miller (who both also served as music supervisors; Miller also served as ADR recordist and record producer) along with Victor Bruno (who also served as an ADR recordist; he also did the audio mix and design, and the sound design with Tom Gambale) and Stephen Tubin who composed and arranged the score. The first hit single "Ok, You're Right" from 50 Cent's fourth studio album of the same name was contributed to, and played in, Before I Self Destruct. The first single from the album was produced by Dr. Dre (who also served as 50 Cent's executive producer for the album).

Tony Yayo, another member from G-Unit, contributed his solo rap song "Face Off" (produced by Dream Team) in the film. Other contributed songs in the film include the following Ky Miller-produced tracks: "Come With Me" by Mass Hysteria, "It's Going Down" by Mike Knox, "Tell Me" by American female R&B singer Taryn Fouche, "All Night" by American rapper Smitty, and "Pray for Me" by R&B singer Gasner Hughes.

Prodigy contributed the song "Murder Murder" for the film, which produced by The Alchemist. 50 Cent also contributed three more rap songs in the film, such as the non-album single "Get Up" (produced by Scott Storch), which was replaced by the album's second single "Baby by Me" for the album of the same name, "Try Me" and "Cold Blooded" (both produced by Ky Miller).

See also 
 List of hood films

References

External links

 
 

2009 films
2009 crime drama films
American crime drama films
American musical drama films
Films directed by 50 Cent
American gang films
2000s hip hop films
Hood films
Films shot in New Jersey
2009 directorial debut films
2000s English-language films
2000s American films